Michael Graham Ruddock Sandberg, Baron Sandberg, CBE (31 May 1927 – 2 July 2017) was executive chairman of The Hongkong and Shanghai Banking Corporation from 1977 to 1986.

Biography
Sandberg was born in Surrey and educated at St Edward's School, Oxford.  In 1945 he joined the army and was commissioned 2nd lieutenant in the Royal Armoured Corps in 1946, and was promoted to lieutenant in November 1947. He later volunteered to join the Indian Army. Upon Indian independence he joined the First King's Dragoon Guards in January 1949.

In 1949 he joined The Hongkong and Shanghai Banking Corporation, becoming Chairman and Chief Executive in 1977. During his chairmanship the bank saw substantial international expansion, acquiring a 51% stake in Marine Midland Bank in the United States of America, establishing the Hongkong Bank of Canada in 1981 and HongkongBank of Australia Limited in 1986. As Chairman Sandberg was responsible for the construction of the landmark HSBC Main Building in Central, Hong Kong, which at the time was the most expensive building ever constructed in the world. Having been appointed an Officer of the Order of the British Empire (OBE) in 1977 and promoted to a Commander (CBE) in 1982, on retirement he received a knighthood for "public services in Hong Kong". On 2 October 1997 he was created a life peer in the House of Lords as Baron Sandberg of Passfield in the County of Hampshire. He retired from the House on 8 May 2015. He died on 2 July 2017 at the age of 90.

References

External links
Lord Sandberg profile at the site of Liberal Democrats

}

1927 births
2017 deaths
Chairmen of HSBC
Liberal Democrats (UK) life peers
Life peers created by Elizabeth II
People educated at St Edward's School, Oxford
Members of the Executive Council of Hong Kong
Presidents of Surrey County Cricket Club
20th-century British Army personnel
Royal Armoured Corps officers